What a Girl Wants is a 2003 American teen comedy film directed by Dennie Gordon and written by Jenny Bicks and Elizabeth Chandler. Based on the 1955 play The Reluctant Debutante by William Douglas-Home, it is the second adaptation for the screen of this work. It stars Amanda Bynes, Colin Firth, and Kelly Preston. The film was released on April 4, 2003, received mixed reviews and grossed $50 million worldwide.

Plot
Daphne Reynolds is a 17-year-old American girl, living with her wedding singer mother, Libby, above a restaurant in Chinatown, New York City. Libby had met Briton Henry Dashwood in Morocco, and they married in a Bedouin wedding ceremony of uncertain legality. They returned to his family estate in England. His father soon died, making Henry the Lord Dashwood. Alistair Payne, the family's aristocratic advisor, tricks Libby into leaving, telling her it is best for Henry's duties not to know she is pregnant, then he lies to Henry, hiding the pregnancy from him and saying that Libby claimed to be leaving because she was in love with someone else.

Libby has always been honest with Daphne about who her father is, though Daphne feels a sense of emptiness without him. When Daphne graduates from high school, she runs off to London to try and meet her father. Henry has disclaimed his seat in the House of Lords to run for election to the House of Commons, hoping to eventually become Prime Minister of the United Kingdom. Henry is being pushed by Alistair, acting as his political advisor. Henry is engaged to Alistair's daughter, the snobby Glynnis, who has an equally snobby teenage daughter, Clarissa.

Checking into a London hostel, Daphne meets Ian Wallace, a local boy who works there to support his dream of making it as a musician. After forming a friendship when Ian shows Daphne around London, they start dating. When Henry catches Daphne at his estate, he is stunned to learn he has a child, but his mother, Jocelyne, immediately welcomes her in, giving her a room at the estate. After confirming things in a phone call with Libby, Henry embraces the opportunity to connect with Daphne. Daphne tries to win the acceptance of her father's social circle, but is repeatedly thwarted by Glynnis and Clarissa. In addition, Daphne has to ward off the advances of Armistead Stewart, a sleazy and arrogant upper-class boy whom Clarissa fancies and with whom Ian has long-standing rivalry. Daphne eventually pushes him into the Thames.

Daphne inadvertently wins over the aristocracy, including the elderly Princess Charlotte, whenever she interacts with them. However, Henry's political campaign suffers due to Daphne's flamboyant behavior, and his subsequent misbehavior with her. He asks her to assume the more dignified manner of the Dashwood lineage, after which Henry's polling numbers quickly improve. Ian is disappointed in her new behavior, made worse when she stands him up in favor of attending an upper-class social function.

During her coming-out party, hosted by her father (who flies Libby over to attend), Daphne overhears Alistair telling Glynnis how he "got rid of" Libby 17 years earlier. When Daphne confronts him, Glynnis locks her in another room. Glynnis then asks Ian, the band's lead singer, to announce the father–daughter dance, knowing Henry will have to dance with Clarissa. Libby frees Daphne, but when they see Henry dancing with Clarissa, Daphne rejects her new self, telling Henry she is returning to the United States. Sometime later, Henry surprises everyone by announcing that he is withdrawing from the election. As he leaves the press conference, Henry discovers that Alistair knew about Libby's pregnancy and manipulated their separation. Henry punches Alistair in the face, then breaks off his engagement to Glynnis.

Daphne is serving as a caterer at a wedding, where Libby is the singer. When the father–daughter dance begins, Henry shows up, telling Daphne that he loves her for who she is. Daphne embraces him, calling him "Dad" for the first time. Daphne finally gets the father–daughter dance she has been longing for her whole life. Henry informs Daphne that he has brought a large apology present for her—at which point Ian appears and asks her to dance. As Ian and Daphne dance, Henry apologizes to Libby, and the two also start dancing.

In the epilogue, Glynnis marries a wealthy nobleman (who bores her to death), Clarissa marries Armistead (who still womanizes), and Alistair works on a London tour bus. Henry and Libby are legally married in a Bedouin ceremony. Daphne is accepted into Oxford and is dating Ian.

Cast

 Amanda Bynes as Daphne Reynolds, the main protagonist. A 17-year-old American girl living in New York with her single mom Libby, Daphne has desired to meet the father she never met, Henry Dashwood, for most of her life. Care-free, eccentric, but loyal and kind-hearted, Daphne tries her best to fit in with her father's world, but ultimately finds out that she is happy for who she truly is. 
 Colin Firth as Henry Dashwood. Daphne's biological father and Libby's former love. First appearing as stuffy, Henry is a kind man who buries his own eccentric, carefree life style in the favor of keeping up appearances. Although he previously thinks that Libby left him for someone else, he is still in love with her. At first shocked that he has a daughter, Henry warms up to Daphne and ultimately realizes that he needs her and Libby in his life. 
 Kelly Preston as Libby Reynolds. Daphne's compassionate and supportive mother and the love of Henry's life, who works as a wedding singer. 
 Eileen Atkins as Jocelyne Dashwood. Henry's widowed mother and Daphne's grandmother. Level-headed and having a dry wit, Jocelyne openly welcomes Daphne into the Dashwoods' lives. She despises Alistair, Glynnis and Clarissa for their snobbiness and over-emphasis on social standing, preferring the more authentic and humble Daphne.      
 Anna Chancellor as Glynnis Payne. Henry's fiancée, Alistair Payne's daughter and Clarissa's mother. A snobby and materialistic upper-class woman, Glynnis is over concerned with appearances. She and Clarissa feel threatened by Daphne's arrival. 
 Jonathan Pryce as Alistair Payne. Henry's pompous and manipulative advisor and campaign manager. He was the advisor of Henry's late father. Alistair orchestrated Henry and Libby's separation, because he viewed Libby as unsuitable to be a lady.
 Oliver James as Ian Wallace, a young, aspiring British musician and Daphne's love interest. He loves Daphne for her go-getting, lively personality, though he tries to be supportive of her trying to fit in, even though she was really "born to stand out".
 Christina Cole as Clarissa Payne. Glynnis's equally snobby, bratty and gossipy daughter and Alistair's granddaughter. As the stereotypical evil stepsister, Clarissa is not as intelligent as her mother, but is cruel to Daphne and everyone she views as of lower standing.  
 Sylvia Syms as Princess Charlotte, a royal whom Daphne befriends.
 Tara Summers as Noelle
 Ben Scholfield as Armistead Stuart, an arrogant and womanizing upper-class boy whom Clarissa fancies. He lusts for Daphne, who wants absolutely nothing to do with him. He gets his comeuppance when Daphne publicly humiliates him by dumping him into the Thames River.

Release

Critical response
On Rotten Tomatoes the film holds an approval rating of 36% based on 109 reviews, with an average rating of 4.80/10. The website's critical consensus reads, "Little girls will definitely enjoy it, but it's too syrupy and predictable for adults." On Metacritic, the film has a weighted average score of 41 out of 100, based on 27 critics, indicating "mixed or average reviews". Audiences surveyed by CinemaScore gave the film a grade "A" on scale of A to F.

The film is available on various streaming services.

Edward Guthmann of The San Francisco Chronicle called it a "dreadful teen comedy." Anya Kamenetz of The Village Voice described the film as "a sanitized adventure for the Mary Kate-and-Ashley set."

Box office
In its opening weekend, the film grossed $11.4 million in 2,964 theaters in the United States and Canada, ranking #2 at the box office behind fellow newcomer Phone Booth ($15 million). By the end of its run, the film had grossed $36.1 million domestically and $14.6 million internationally, totaling $50.7 million worldwide.

Promotion
Before the US release of the film, print advertisements were altered to remove the peace sign that Bynes was giving in the poster as the 2003 invasion of Iraq by the United States, the United Kingdom and their allied forces had begun. A rep for Warner Bros. explained "'In a time of war, we made a slight alteration so that we could avoid any potential political statement in a completely nonpolitical film."

Accolades

The film won and was nominated for a number of awards throughout 2004.

References

External links

 
 

2003 films
2003 romantic comedy films
2000s coming-of-age comedy films
2000s teen comedy films
2000s teen romance films
American coming-of-age comedy films
American films based on plays
American romantic comedy films
American teen comedy films
American teen romance films
Coming-of-age romance films
2000s English-language films
Films about father–daughter relationships
Films directed by Dennie Gordon
Films produced by Denise Di Novi
Films set in London
Films set in New York City
Films shot in Buckinghamshire
Films shot in Hertfordshire
Films shot in London
Films shot in Morocco
Films shot in New York City
Films shot in Oxfordshire
Warner Bros. films
2000s American films